Rudy Colman (born 15 January 1956) is a Belgian former racing cyclist. He rode in the 1979 Tour de France.

Major results
1976
 1st Omloop der Vlaamse Gewesten Amateurs
1978
 3rd GP Stad Zottegem
 5th Nokere Koerse
1979
 1st Omloop der Drie Provinciën
 1st Puivelde Koerse
 3rd Leiedal Koerse
 5th Nokere Koerse
1980
 1st Stage 1 Tour de l'Aude
 1st Berner Rundfahrt
 1st Tour du Nord-Ouest
 2nd Halse Pijl
 4th Omloop van het Waasland
1981
 9th Brabantse Pijl
1982
 1st GP Stad Zottegem
 1st Prix de Mellet
1983
 1st Poperinge-Harelbeke

References

1956 births
Living people
Belgian male cyclists
Sportspeople from Ghent
Cyclists from East Flanders